Mohamed Ibrahim Warsame (1943 – 18 August 2022), known by the pseudonym Hadrawi, was a Somali poet, philosopher and songwriter. Having written many notable protest works, Hadrawi has been likened by some to Shakespeare, and his poetry has been translated into various languages.

Biography

Hadrawi was born in Burao, situated in the Togdheer region of Somaliland, then part of British Somaliland. Hadrawi hails from the Ahmed Farah sub-division of the Habr Je'lo Isaaq. His family consisted of one girl and eight boys. In 1953, at the age of nine, he went to live with an uncle in the Yemeni port city of Aden. There Warsame began attending a local school, where he received the nickname "Hadrawi" (Abu Hadra), a pseudonym by which he is now popularly known. In 1963, he became a primary school teacher.

Return to The Somali Republic 

After British Somaliland gained independence on June 26th 1960 and then formed a union with the Italian Somalia (who gained independence on the 1st July 1960), Hadrawi relocated from Aden to Mogadishu, the newly formed Somali Republic’s capital, and began working for Radio Mogadiscio. In Mogadishu, he both attended and later taught at the Lafoole University (Afgooye). He also worked for the government's Department of Information.

In addition to love lyrics, he was a powerful commentator on the political situation and critic of the then military regime in Mogadishu (former Italian Somalia section) who allegedly oppressed the former portion of British Somaliland. Imprisoned between 1973 and 1978.

In 1973, Hadrawi wrote the poem Siinley and the play Tawaawac ('Lament'), both of which were critical of the military government that was then in power. For this dissent, he was subsequently arrested and imprisoned in Qansax Dheere until April 1978.

Somali National Movement

Following his release from prison in 1978, Hadrawi became the director of the arts division of the Academy of Science, Arts, and Literature in The Somali Republic. when he joined the opposition Somali National Movement (to liberate the former British Somaliland section from the dictatorship and oppression from the Somali Republic who targeted the Isaaq clan which Hadrawi was a part of), based in Ethiopia. He was a very powerful voice in the ensuing years of the "Isaaq Genocide",  war and the repressive military regime on the Isaaq peoples of Somaliland , and continues to be a very important poet commenting on the predicament the Somali speaking people’s face.

Hadrawi relocated to United Kingdom in 1991 after the liberation of (fr British ) Somaliland and revocation of the union between fr. British Somaliland and fr. Italian Somalia. With Somaliland (Fr. British Somaliland going back to its original borders of June 26th 1960). During this period, he traveled frequently throughout Europe and North America to participate in folklore and poetry festivals.

In 1999, Hadrawi returned once more to his native Somaliland, this time settling in Hargeisa. The following year, the mayor of Chicago invited him to participate in the latter city's Millennium Festival.

Hadrawi later lived in Burao, and reportedly made a (hajj) pilgrimage to Mecca.

Death

Hadrawi died in Hargeisa , Somaliland  on 18 August 2022, at the age of 79.

Contributions to popular music

Besides volumes of poems and dozens of plays, Hadrawi participated in numerous collaborations with popular vocal artists. His lyrical corpus includes:
 "Baladweyn" – song performed by Hasan Adan Samatar in 1974
 "Saxarlaay ha Fududaan" – sung by Mohamed Mooge Liibaan
 "Jacayl Dhiig ma Lagu Qoraa?" – sung by Magool, and later translated by Hanna Barket as "Is Love Written in Blood?" or "Do You Write Love in Blood?". Another translation of the song by the British linguist and Somali Studies doyen Martin Orwin is "Has Love Been Blood-written?".

Awards

In 2012, Hadraawi was awarded the Prince Claus Award for his contributions to peace through poetry.

Works

 Hooya la'anta ('Motherlessness')
 Beled Wayn
 Hablaha geeska
 Gudgude
 Siinley
 Sirta nolosha
 Tawaawac
 Aqoon iyo afgarad
 Deeley
 Hawaale warran
 Bulshooy

See also

 Gaariye
 Elmi Boodhari
 Abdillahi Suldaan Mohammed Timacade
 Salaan Carrabey
 Kite Fiqi

Notes

References

General references

Further reading

External links
 

1943 births
2022 deaths
Somalian dramatists and playwrights
Somalian poets
Somali-language writers
People from Burao
Somalian Muslims
20th-century Somalian writers
20th-century poets
21st-century poets
Ethnic Somali people
21st-century Somalian writers
African philosophers
20th-century Muslims
21st-century Muslims
Somalian male writers
20th-century male writers
21st-century male writers